Maurice Roy Hurst (born September 17, 1967) is an American former football player who was a cornerback for seven seasons for the New England Patriots in the National Football League (NFL).  He played college football at Southern University, where he was a teammate of future hall of fame defensive back Aeneas Williams. His son, Maurice Hurst Jr., is currently a defensive tackle for the San Francisco 49ers.

Professional career

References

1967 births
Living people
American football cornerbacks
New England Patriots players
Southern Jaguars football players
Players of American football from New Orleans